Richter LLP is a Business | Family Office that provides strategic advice on business matters and on families’ financial and personal objectives across generations. With close to 100 years of experience advising at the intersection of family and business, Richter has developed an integrated approach to help business owners find sustainable success. Whether business, personal, or both, Richter is uniquely positioned to address the needs of Canada’s most successful entrepreneurs, private clients, business owners and business families and help them chart a clear path to shape their legacy for the future. Founded in 1926, Richter’s 600-person multidisciplinary team continuously innovates to create value for our people, clients, and community in Canada and in the US.

History

The firm was founded in 1926 in Montreal, Canada, by Cecil Usher and William Richter under its first corporate name, Richter, Usher & Co. Beginning as an accounting firm, Richter has broadened their service offerings, now additionally specializing in insolvencies, restructuring, consulting, and business valuation.

In 1962, Richter became the first independent accounting firm in Canada to sign a prospectus for a public offering.

In 1999, the Richter Family Office was founded to provide wealth management services to high-net-worth individuals.

In 2013, The firm left RSM International after being part of the network for 10 years.

In 2016, Richter became the ninth-largest accounting services firm in Canada.

Today, Richter has evolved from an accounting and financial advisory firm into a Business | Family Office

References

External links 
 Richter.ca (official web site)

Accounting firms of Canada
Financial services companies established in 1926
Privately held companies of Canada
Companies based in Montreal
1926 establishments in Quebec